The 1999 Sandown V8 Supercar round was the sixth round of the 1999 Shell Championship Series. It was held on the weekend of 25 to 27 June at Sandown International Raceway in Melbourne, Victoria.

Race results

Qualifying

References

External links 

Sandown